Chinocossus hunanensis is a moth in the family Cossidae. It is found in China (Hunan).

References

Natural History Museum Lepidoptera generic names catalog

Cossinae
Moths described in 1940
Moths of Asia